Robert Wilson (4 February 1854 – 6 July 1911) was a Scotland international rugby union player who represented Scotland in 1873 and 1874.

Rugby Union career

Amateur career

Wilson played for West of Scotland.

Provincial career

He represented Glasgow District against Edinburgh District in the world's first provincial match, the 'inter-city', on 23 November 1872.

International career

His international debut was the home match against England on 3 March 1873 at Glasgow.

He played again for Scotland, against England, in the following year's fixture at The Oval on 23 February 1874.

References

1854 births
1911 deaths
Scottish rugby union players
Scotland international rugby union players
West of Scotland FC players
Rugby union forwards
Glasgow District (rugby union) players